World of Winx is an Italian Flash animated television series and a spin-off of Winx Club. The series was created by Iginio Straffi. Twenty-six episodes were produced in two seasons, the first of which was premiered as a Netflix original series on 4 November 2016.

The series was produced by Rainbow S.p.A., a studio co-owned by Straffi and Viacom at the time. The series was released on Netflix in most territories worldwide. Exceptions included Italy and Greece, where it was broadcast on Rai Gulp and Viacom's Nickelodeon, respectively. In 2016, Rainbow's Cristiana Buzzelli confirmed that the Netflix streaming company did "not enter into the creative process on scripts, characters or plot lines."

Story
The Winx Club girls return to Gardenia, Bloom's hometown on Earth, where they work as a group of talent scouts on a reality television program to find children and teenagers of various talents. Behind the scenes, they try to save them from being kidnapped by a Talent Thief while hiding their own identities as fairies. In the first season, the Winx Club girls achieve a new level of magical transformation, which is called "Dreamix". They get help on occasion from their good friend and fellow fairy Roxy, the owner of the Frutti Music Bar.

In the second season, the Winx Club, minus Roxy, receive new missions from the spirit of the World of Dreams. They learn of the Queen's troubled past and hope to return her to the good fairy she was once by reuniting her with her lost love, Peter Pan. Their Dreamix transformations and powers are upgraded to "Onyrix". Initially, Jim and Smee ally with the Winx Club girls in facing the Queen and her shadow creatures. The Winx must also deal with special shadow creatures called a Nemesis (Vertigo, Banshee, Obscura, Stoney, Sinka and Virus) which are drawn from the dark essence of each of the fairies' deepest uncertainties.

Characters

Winx Club

The series features seven fairies from the original Winx Club series:
Bloom: Fairy of the Dragon Flame and the leader of the Winx Club who is from the restored planet Domino but grew up on Earth. She has red waist-length hair, light blue eyes and tan skin. As the Keeper of the all-powerful Dragon Flame, the limitless cosmic power of the Great Dragon himself, she can control Fire, heat and lava as well as heal. 
Stella: Fairy of the Shining Sun from the planet Solaria. She has waist-length blonde hair and hazel brown eyes. She loves drawing designs and fashion. Her magic is derived from light (sunlight, moonlight, and starlight). In season 2, her stronger Dreamix-Onyrix power gives her the ability to look into the memories made in a location.
Flora: Fairy of Nature from the planet of nature Lynphea. The most kind-hearted of the Winx Club. She has waist-length honey-colored hair. Her magic enables her to create, control and communicate with plants, vegetation and the element of Earth.
Tecna: Fairy of Technology from the planet of techno-magic Zenith. She can speak to all types of machinery and electronics, and she can also control lightning. When she is combined with dark magic, she can be turned into her dark-robot of herself. Her hair is colored purple instead of hot pink in this series.
Musa: Fairy of Music from the planet Melody. She has waist-length blue hair with bangs and pale skin. She has the power to create powerful ultrasonic waves of incredibly high frequencies and create solid barriers of sound.
Aisha: Fairy of Waves from the planet Andros. She has brown skin, wavy tawny port brown hair and blue eyes. She has the power to create and manipulate water as well as a pink liquid called "Morphix."
Roxy: Fairy of Animals from planet Earth. Like in the original series, she works at the Frutti Music Bar. She has a dog named Arthur (from the original's Artu), with whom she can use her strong animal-related magic to see whatever he sees from a great distance. Roxy helped Bloom, after she was fired from WOW!, in eluding the persistent detectives Gomez and Evans. She appeared only in five episodes and did not transform.

Others

 Ace: the host of the Wow! show. He has grey hair with white streaks. He always strives to be positive and enthusiastic when he is on camera, but off-screen, he loses patience because the Winx regularly disappear from the show and evade his show's camera drones. He is especially annoyed by Bloom. In the episode "The Fashion Week", when she accidentally knocks off his hairpiece in front of the camera, he is so enraged that he fires Bloom on the spot, and replaces her with Lorelei. He is later hypnotized by Smee to put the Winx in a dangerous situation with Smee's zombie pirates, firing Lorelei when she tries to tell him the Winx are fairies, and reinstating Bloom. He does not return in Season 2.
 Margot: a judge on the Wow! show. She dislikes all of the presented acts and always votes against them. She has a dog named Puff who sits on her lap. She does not return in Season 2.
 Cliff: a judge on the Wow! show. He tends to be optimistic and votes towards retaining the talent prospects for the finals. He does not return in Season 2.
: A tinker fairy from the world of dreams, Neverland. In her corrupt form, she manipulates the shadow creatures to kidnap young talented people from Earth in order to steal their talents for her own. After abducting upcoming singer Annabelle, she adopts Annabelle's voice, after revealing she didn't have a voice before she took the Annabelle's voice. In the season 1 finale, she steals Bloom's infinitely strong Dragon Fire powers to fight the other six Winx fairies but is defeated. It is then revealed that she is Tinkerbell from the Peter Pan stories, and that she had fallen in love with Peter Pan, but had left her to go to Earth. In the second season, she summons a particular shadow creature called a "nemesis" based on the dark essence of each of the fairies, again excluding fellow fairy Roxy.
 Smee: He first appears in Episode 10, "Dangerous Waters" as an assistant to the Wow! show, but he uses his powers to hypnotize Ace, as well as control an army of zombie pirates. At the end of the first season, it is revealed he is Mr. Smee from Peter Pan and that he has sided with Captain Hook once again.
: An elusive man with dark purple hair, who Bloom and Roxy tried to chase down at the start of the series, suspected of being Annabelle's abductor. He has the ability to turn invisible. In the first season, he escapes Annabelle's apartment but drops his pocket watch. He later works with Bloom to try to rescue Annabelle. At the end of season 1, it is revealed he is Captain Hook from Peter Pan, and that he was made young by the Queen (Tinkerbell)'s powerful fairy magic. Throughout Season Two, he intended to dominate all of Neverland by getting rid of Tinkerbell and, ultimately, the Winx Club. He had attempted to corrupt the very Heart of Neverland itself by turning it into a flying pirate ship. He is beaten by the Winx Club, Matt and Tinkerbell's combined strength and falls right into a portal to the world of nightmares.
 Gomez: An undercover police detective who works with Evans on the case of Annabelle's abduction. They frequently find ways to spy on the Winx Club. He likes to be casually friendly towards his partner, often thinking of their adventures like dating situations, but doesn't understand why Evans and women detectives, in general, are so serious. Her first name is not known.
 Evans: An undercover police detective who investigates the Winx for the abduction of Annabelle. She is fairly serious, and gets annoyed about Gomez's casual attitude and incompetence; especially of his flirting with her.
 Venomya: A critic that dislikes the musical performances put together by the Winx Club, and tries to write bad reviews. She first appears in season 2, where she has long blond hair. Her true identity is "Baba Yaga the Dark Dame" claiming that there is not enough room for both fairies and witches on Earth. She would be the main protagonist in Season 3 had it been made.

Supporting

 Annabelle: a waitress who is recruited as a talent prospect for the Wow! show. She has a beautiful singing voice. Her abduction becomes the main storyline in the first season. In the first two episodes of season 2, she joins the Winx during their performances in London, New York City, and Paris along with her friend Louise. Her hair is now shoulder-length and has some lines on it.
 Crocodile Man: a servant of the Queen who is an anthropomorphic crocodile. He first appears in the New York City episodes, but later returns when the Queen summons him to go after Jim and the Winx. He is based on the crocodile in the Peter Pan stories.
 Lorelei: a blond-haired girl who joins the Winx on the Wow! show as a talent scout when Bloom is fired. She likes to be the center of attention. She and Stella do not get along. In the episode "Dangerous Waters", when she discovers that the Winx are fairies, she tries to tell Ace and the Wow! show but is laughed off and fired.
 The Shaman: a native martial artist who works for the Queen to kidnap talent prospects. He uses a set of stones that give him special powers, including allowing him to disappear in a puff of smoke.
 The Spirit of the World of Dreams: The spiritual manifestation of the world of dreams itself. She summons the Winx Club girls and warns them of the grave danger her world was in, further developing and amplifying their Dreamix abilities into the evolved power of Onyrix.
 Matt Barrie: The only child of Peter Pan, the legendary hero of Neverland. The Winx Club seek to find him so they he can lead them to his long-lost father. He has curly brown hair, and originally lived in London with Wendy Darling and Peter until Peter left. He lives in Paris. Later found by Musa's sound magic, he was teleported to the dream world, where he met the Queen in the forest and expressed his enduring love for her. After Jim/Captain Hook falls into the dark world of nightmares, he rules as King of Neverland alongside his love Tinkerbell.

Episodes

Season 1 (2016)

Season 2 (2017)

Production
In September 2014, as part of its efforts to increase kids' programming, it was announced that Netflix had ordered from Rainbow two seasons of World of Winx, each comprising 13 22-minute episodes. The premise of the show is that the "girls embark on an undercover journey all around the world looking for talented kids in art, sports, music and science."

Originally slated to premiere in early 2016, the series was delayed until later that year, eventually premiering in 4 November as a Netflix original series. At the Licensing Expo in Las Vegas in 2016, it was revealed that the storyline involved a Talent Thief that had been capturing children. The second season was released on Netflix on 16 June 2017. The series was not renewed for a third season, ending the show on an unresolved cliffhanger.

Reception

Ella Anders, a regular reviewer of magical girl-themed shows on BSC Kids, had low expectations on the series given that the more recent seasons of Winx Club were shells of their original, but said "So it was all that much stranger when I realized just how good World of Winx actually is". She liked that the series made the story meaningful. "Every moment counts, the story is a good one that is tightly woven together. The humour and heart shines. The girls are using their magic wisely and creatively." She especially liked that the Winx girls were "back to their old selves".

Works cited
  "Ep." is shortened form for episode and refers to an episode number in World of Winx.

References

External links
 
 World of Winx on Netflix 
 

Winx Club
2016 Italian television series debuts
2017 Italian television series endings
2010s Italian television series
2010s animated television series
Italian children's animated fantasy television series
Anime-influenced Western animated television series
Fictional talent agents
Netflix children's programming
Drone films
Peter Pan television series
Television shows set in Paris
Animated television series spinoffs
Italian-language Netflix original programming
English-language Netflix original programming
Television series by Rainbow S.r.l.
Television series created by Iginio Straffi